Marianne Smith  (born Mary Anne Caughey; 10 March 1851 – 1 September 1938), and known as Marianne Caughey Preston since 1932, was a notable New Zealand businesswoman, community worker and philanthropist.

Mary Anne Caughey was born in Portaferry, County Down, Ireland, in 1851.

Marianne Smith established Smith & Caughey's in 1880. Her husband joined her when there was sufficient business to support the two of them. In the 1935 King's Birthday Honours, she was appointed a Member of the Order of the British Empire, for philanthropic services.

She died at her home in Auckland on 1 September 1938, and was buried at Purewa Cemetery in the Auckland suburb of Meadowbank.

In 2009, Smith was posthumously inducted into the New Zealand Business Hall of Fame.

References

1851 births
1938 deaths
People from Portaferry
New Zealand women in business
New Zealand philanthropists
Irish emigrants to New Zealand (before 1923)
Burials at Purewa Cemetery
New Zealand Members of the Order of the British Empire